The Association for Media Development in South Sudan (AMDISS) is a media association based in Juba, South Sudan. It was founded in 2003.

The group works to help strengthen the media and provide a framework in South Sudan to ensure freedom of speech, the right to information and other human rights, and aims to protect freedom of expression, freedom of the press, and the allowance of self-regulation by the media.

References

External links
AMDISS on Facebook

Human rights organisations based in South Sudan
Freedom of expression in Africa
Freedom of expression organizations
2003 establishments in Africa